1995 World Cup may refer to:
1995 Rugby World Cup, held in South Africa for rugby union
1995 Rugby League World Cup, held in England and Wales for rugby league
1995 FIFA Women's World Cup, held in Sweden for women's football (soccer)
1995 Alpine Skiing World Cup